Simon Kofe is a Tuvaluan politician. He was appointed as the Minister for Justice, Communication & Foreign Affairs, in the cabinet of Kausea Natano following the 2019 Tuvaluan general election.

Early life
The son of a Tuvaluan teacher at the University of the South Pacific (USP) in Suva, Fiji, Kofe was educated in a primary school of the Marist Brothers in Suva. He attended secondary school in various schools while his parents worked in several countries of Oceania.

Legal career
Kofe earned a Bachelor of Laws degree from the University of the South Pacific in 2004, followed by a Master's degree in International Maritime Law from the University of Malta in 2014. As the former senior magistrate of Tuvalu, Afele Kitiona, retired in mid-June 2014, Kofe was appointed as senior magistrate on 24 September 2014.

In May 2016, as the senior magistrate, Kofe determined that former Prime Minister Apisai Ielemia was guilty of corruption and sentenced him to 12-month imprisonment. In June 2016, Justice Norman Franzi of the High Court of Tuvalu quashed Ielemia's conviction and acquitted him of the abuse of office charges. The appeal to the High Court held that the conviction was "manifestly unsafe", with the court quashing the 12-month jail term. On 13 March 2017, the Court of Appeal upheld an appeal by the Crown on the sole ground that the personal interactions outside Court between Justice Franzi and counsel for Ielemia meant that the judgment of acquittal had to be set aside. The effect of the judgment was that Ielemia's conviction and sentence by the Senior Magistrate was re-instated but remained subject to a rehearing of the appeal by the High Court. On 26 May 2017, following the rehearing of Ielemia's appeal against conviction and the Crown's appeal against sentence, Justice Finnane dismissed Ielemia's appeal and upheld the Crown appeal against sentence and, on 29 May 2017, imposed a new sentence of one year and 11 months. On 18 September 2017, the Court of Appeal dismissed Ielemia's appeal on conviction and allowed the appeal on sentence thereby reinstating the Senior Magistrate's sentence of 12 months imprisonment.

Parliamentary career
Sir Kamuta Latasi resigned as MP on 17 October 2018. A by-election was held on 20 November 2018, with Kofe winning his seat with a 30.5% of the total votes in his favour. In an interview he stated that he would like to contribute to the constitutional reform project, with which project he had participated in his role as senior magistrate.

He served in the parliamentary Opposition in the government of Prime Minister Enele Sopoaga during the last months of the 2015-2019 legislature. At the time of his election to parliament, he was the youngest of the members of parliament at age 35. He was re-elected in the 2019 Tuvaluan general election.

On 19 September 2019, Kausea Natano was voted into the office of Prime Minister of Tuvalu by a parliamentary majority consisting of 10 MPs. Kofe was appointed as the Minister for Justice, Communication & Foreign Affairs.

In November 2021, Kofe recorded a speech for the COP26. In the video, he stood knee-deep in seawater to highlight Tuvalu being on the frontline of climate change. The following year, in November 2022, he recorded a speech where he outlined that in response to rising sea levels, Tuvalu will replicate itself into the Metaverse, stating that "our land, our ocean, our culture are the most precious assets of our people and to keep them safe from harm, no matter what happens in the physical world, we will move them to the cloud."

References

University of the South Pacific alumni
Members of the Parliament of Tuvalu
People from Funafuti
Living people
Foreign Ministers of Tuvalu
Year of birth missing (living people)